This is a list of the tallest structures in Myanmar. The list has two main parts: one list for the tallest buildings above , and another list for other tallest structures above . The lists are based on publicly available data and may likely be incomplete as the information on structures and buildings in the country is poorly documented and/or not publicly available.

The vast majority of the country's recorded tallest structures have been Buddhist pagodas and statues. The  Yeywa Dam in Kyaukse is currently the tallest structure in the country.

Tallest buildings
See List of tallest buildings in Myanmar.

Tallest structures except buildings, masts or towers
The following is a list of tallest known structures above  in Myanmar, excluding buildings, guyed masts, or cellular towers, ranked by their pinnacle height.

Many of the structures on the list are Buddhist stupas (pagodas), temples, and statues. Many pagodas have been rebuilt many times throughout their history, often taller. Furthermore, Burmese pagodas are typically measured by their architectural height (nyandaw) without including the height of the hti spire. The htis are replaced periodically, and the new htis may change in size and height, thus altering the overall pinnacle height of their pagoda. Height estimates are given in italics.

The list may not be complete or up-to-date.

Timeline of tallest structures

By architectural height
This is a list of tallest known structures in Myanmar as measured by architectural height without including spires such as htis or antennas.

The list may not be complete or up-to-date.

By pinnacle height
This is a list of tallest known structures in Myanmar as measured by pinnacle height.

The list may not be complete or up-to-date.

See also
 List of tallest buildings in Yangon

Notes

References

Bibliography
 
 
 
 
 

Lists of buildings and structures in Myanmar
Architecture in Myanmar
Myanmar